Micronelima brevipes is a species of harvestmen in a monotypic genus in the family Sclerosomatidae from Spain.

References

Harvestmen
Monotypic arachnid genera